"Let there be light" is an English translation of the Hebrew  (yehi 'or) found in Genesis 1:3 of the Torah, the first part of the Hebrew Bible.

Genesis 1
The phrase comes from the third verse of the Book of Genesis. In the King James Bible, it reads, in context:

Origin and etymology
In biblical Hebrew, the phrase  (yəhî ’ôr) is made of two words.

In the Koine Greek Septuagint the phrase is translated "" — kaì eîpen ho Theós genēthḗtō phôs kaì egéneto phôs. Γενηθήτω is the imperative form of γίγνομαι, "to come into being."

The original Latinization of the Greek translation used in the Vetus Latina was lux sit ("light – let it exist" or "let light exist"), which has been used occasionally, although there is debate as to its accuracy.

In the Latin Vulgate Bible, the Hebrew phrase  is translated in Latin as fiat lux. In context, the translation is "" ("And said God let there be light, and there was light"). Literally, fiat lux would be translated as "let light be made" (fiat is the third person singular present passive subjunctive form of the verb facio, meaning "to do" or "to make"). The Douay–Rheims Bible translates the phrase, from the Vulgate, as "Be light made. And light was made."

Use by educational institutions

Fiat lux or Sit lux appears in the motto and on the seals of a number of educational institutions, including:

Fiat Lux also appears on the outside of Kerns Religious Life Center at Capital University in Columbus, Ohio. The second half of the same verse, Et facta est lux appears on the seal of Morehouse College.

In literature

The English phrase concludes Isaac Asimov's The Last Question, symbolizing the godlike growth in power of an extremely advanced computer as it creates a new universe from the ashes of a dead one, drawing comparisons and suggesting an explanation for the biblical Book of Genesis.
 Victor Hugo's novel Les Misérables (The Miserable Ones) speaks about the importance of daring and writes "That cry, 'Audace,' is a Fiat Lux!"
"Fiat Lux!" is the activating phrase in the setting of a Ward Major in Katherine Kurtz's novel series Chronicles of the Deryni.
The Fiat Lux Agency is the name of Nestor Burma's private detective agency, in Léo Malet's novel series New Mysteries of Paris.
One of the three main divisions of Walter M. Miller, Jr.'s novel A Canticle for Leibowitz is titled "Fiat Lux".
 Alexander Pope adapted the phrase in his epitaph for Isaac Newton, who made important advances in optics: "Nature and nature's laws lay hid in Night. / God said, 'Let Newton be!' and all was light."
"Fiat Lux" is also used in the 1982 novel Die Insel des zweiten Gesichts by Albert Vigoleis Thelen.

See also
 Lazarus of Bethany

References

External links
 .
 .
 .
 .
 .
 .
 .

English phrases
Biblical phrases
Light and religion
Bereshit (parashah)
Book of Genesis